All Cats Are Grey in the Dark is a Swiss short documentary film, directed by Lasse Linder and released in 2019. The film centres on Christian, a lonely single man from Bregenz, Austria, who has decided to have his pet cat inseminated to help fulfill his own desire to become a parent.

The film was made as Linder's thesis project in the film studies program at Lucerne University of Applied Sciences and Arts.

The film premiered at the 72nd Locarno Film Festival. It was subsequently screened at the 2019 Toronto International Film Festival, where it won the award for Best International Short Film.

The film won the award for Best Short Film at the 33rd European Film Awards.

References

External links

2019 films
2019 short documentary films
Swiss short films
Swiss documentary films
European Film Awards winners (films)